Rockingham Coastal Sharks Rugby League & Sporting Club is an Australian rugby league football club based at Rockingham, Western Australia formed in 1987 as the Rockingham Raiders. They played their first WARL game in 1988 and the colours were, Primary: Lime Green; Secondary: White; Blue; Yellow. 
In 2004 the club changed names and colours and became the Rockingham Coastal Sharks after absorbing a minor local team, Coastal Cowboys, into their system. 
They conduct teams for both junior and senior teams.

Notable  Juniors
Curtis Dansey-Smaller - Gold Coast Titans U/20's 2017

Shaun McDermott Widnes slugger

See also

Rugby league in Western Australia

References

External links
Rockingham Coastal Sharks Fox Sports pulse

Rugby league teams in Western Australia
1988 establishments in Australia
Rugby clubs established in 1988
Sporting clubs in Rockingham, Western Australia